The Cheetah Girls is the soundtrack album to the 2003 Walt Disney Pictures movie of the same name. It was released on August 12, 2003 on compact disc and audio cassette by Walt Disney Records. The album was produced by Antonina Armato, Ray Cham, Tim James and executive produced by Debra Martin Chase and Whitney Houston. The album features appearances from Sonic Chaos, Char, and Hope 7.

The album was certified Double Platinum in the United States on June 7, 2005 after selling more than 2 million copies in the US alone. It is one of the biggest selling albums from Walt Disney Records ever, along with the High School Musical soundtrack and the Hannah Montana soundtrack.

Background and release
Although there had been music recorded for The Cheetah Girls film, there were originally no plans to release said music commercially since Disney Channel's previous original films never had soundtracks before. Debra Martin Chase was able to convince Disney to create new contracts for the film's actresses and release the film's music as a soundtrack.

A special edition titled "The Cheetah Girls - Special Edition Soundtrack" was released on June 22, 2004, featuring two brand new remixes of "Cinderella" and "Girl Power" with eight karaoke tracks. The special edition credits the song, "End of the Line", to Hope 7, while the original release credits the song to Christi Mac. The reason for this is that Christi Mac is really the alias of Kristi McClave, the lead singer of Hope 7. McClave sang both this song and "Breakthrough" on the original soundtrack. On December 25, 2006, the original soundtrack was released digitally to the iTunes store in the United Kingdom.

Critical reception

Johnny Loftus from Allmusic reviewed the album stating: "From the Disney Channel comes a TV movie adaptation of Deborah Gregory's Cheetah Girls book series. It's the continuing adventures of a smart, sassy singing group as they make their way in the pop music world with nothing but their wits and musical chops to guide them. Along the way, they live a little, rock a little, and learn a lot". Common Sense Media's review of the album complimented The Cheetah Girls' singing, but called the production "prefabricated" and generally disapproved of the musical presentation.

Track listing

Chart performance
The album charted at number one on the Billboard Kid Album charts on October 25, 2003. The album spent a total of sixty-five weeks on the chart. The special edition of the album charted at number three on the Billboard Kid Album charts on July 10, 2004.

Song descriptions
"Together We Can": The Cheetah Girls perform this song during the opening credits at a kids' birthday party, which goes horribly wrong where Aqua, Dorinda, and Chanel end up tripping each other causing them to be a laughing stock.
"Girlfriend": Sung by Char. It is played in the background in the beginning of the movie while Galleria and Chanel are dancing in front of a store.
"Cinderella": The Cheetah Girls perform the song for their audition for the talent show. It is this song that makes Jackal Johnson believe they are the next big thing. The music is played on a laptop by Chanel's younger brother.
"Breakthrough": Sung by Hope 7. It is played in the background while Chanel goes shopping for new Cheetah Girls dress.
"Girl Power": The Cheetah Girls perform this song at Def Duck Records trying to prove to Jackal Johnson they can sing good enough that they don't need the masks and lip-syncing, which is what he wanted them to do. The song samples "All Night Long" by Wild Orchid.
"End of the Line" Sung by Christi Mac (of Hope 7). It is played in the movie after the girls have a fight.
"C'mon": Sonic Chaos, The Cheetah Girls' rival, performs this song at the talent show.
"Cheetah Sisters": The Cheetah Girls began performing this near the end of the movie, as Galleria tries to make up with the girls. The scene changes as they are singing, and they perform this at the talent show, and win. Sonic Chaos perform the music.

Charts

Weekly charts

Year-end charts

Certifications

Release history

References

2003 soundtrack albums
The Cheetah Girls albums
Disney film soundtracks